Metaxy is a concept used by the contemporary political philosopher Eric Voegelin  to mean the permanent place where man is in-between two poles of existence. Such as the infinite (apeiron) and the finite (the divine mind or nous) reality of existence or between the beginning of existence (apeiron) and the beyond existence (epekeina). As a technical usage Voegelin defined metaxy as the connection of the mind or nous to the material world and the reverse of the material world's connection to the mind as "consciousness of being". Under Voegelin it can also be interpreted to mean a form of perception in contrast to consciousness a template of the mind (or nous) in contrast to the dynamic and unordered flow of experiential consciousness. As a form of reflectiveness in-between two poles of experience (finite and the infinite or immanent and transcendent). The whole of existence being expressed as the cosmos. The metaxy being man's connection to the material world this as the ground of being. Voegelin taught that those who sought political power for its own end were sophists and those who were seeking meaning and truth in life or union with the knowable and true, were philosophers. Neoplatonists like Plotinus used the concept to express an ontological placement of Man between the Gods and animals. 

The concept is also used by Simone Weil. She believed that compassion must act in the area of metaxy.

References

Bibliography 
Navia, Luis E., Socrates, the man and his philosophy, pp. 30, 171. University Press of America .
Cooper, John M. & Hutchinson, D. S. (Eds.) (1997). Plato: Complete Works, Hackett Publishing Co., Inc. .
Micael P. Federici, Eric Voegelin The Restoration of Order (2002) ISI Books 
Steel, Sean. (2014). The Pursuit of Wisdom and Happiness in Education: Historical Sources and Contemplative Practices. New York: SUNY Press.

External links
Online text of Symposium
Voegelin, Dostoevsky and the Metaxy

Continental philosophy